Scythris alhamrae is a moth of the family Scythrididae. It was described by Bengt Å. Bengtsson in 2002. It is found in Oman.

The wingspan is 12.5–14 mm. The forewings are olive brown, with a cream streak from the base in the fold, through the cell and reaching the apex, meeting a thin cream costal streak. The hindwings are fuscous with a faint violet hue, at the base slightly paler.

Etymology
The species is named after Al Hamra, the type locality.

References

alhamrae
Moths described in 2002